Segunda División, officially known as Liga FUTVE 2, is the men's second professional football division of the Venezuelan football league system.

The Venezuelan second division was established in 1979.

List of champions

Titles by Team

References

External links
 Segunda División on the FVF's official website
 Resolución de la FVF

 
2
Sports leagues established in 1979
1979 establishments in Venezuela
Second level football leagues of South America